The First National Bank of Rock River was built in 1919 in the small community of Rock River, Wyoming, at the peak of a local oil boom. The First National Bank operated from February 1920 to June 14, 1923, when it went into receivership as the oil boom collapsed and its vice president was convicted of embezzlement. In 1927 the building was sold to the new Citizen's State Bank, but was claimed by Albany County for back taxes in 1931. In 1936 the county sold the building to the town. It became a civic center for the town, operating a post office until the 1950s. A doctor's office had occupied the rear in the 1920s, and in the 1940s apartments were built, which later became the town's jail. With the departure of the post office the building became a fire station. From 1935 to 1985 the Council Room was used by civic organizations. From 1940 to 1985 another room was the town library.

The bank is a one-story brick building covered with stucco over much of the building below the parapet. The front is detailed with engaged Ionic classical columns and an entablature in terra cotta. The narrow end fronts Avenue C. The original vault remains, but most of the interior has been changed several times.

The bank was placed on the National Register of Historic Places on November 21, 1988.

References

External links

 First National Bank of Rock River at the Wyoming State Historic Preservation Office

National Register of Historic Places in Albany County, Wyoming
Neoclassical architecture in Wyoming
Buildings and structures completed in 1919
Bank buildings on the National Register of Historic Places in Wyoming